Tuesday's Child may refer to:

 Tuesday's Child (album), an album by Amanda Marshall
 "Tuesday's Child" (Holby City), an episode of the British television series Holby City
 Tuesday's Child (newspaper), an underground newspaper published in Los Angeles, California
 Tuesday's Child (company), a British television production company

See also
 "Monday's Child", a nursery rhyme
 Tuesday's Children, a non-profit family service organization